Comanche Municipality is the fourth municipal section of the Pacajes Province in the  La Paz Department, Bolivia. Its seat is Comanche.

References 
 www.ine.gov.bo / census 2001: Comanche Municipality

External links 
 Map of the Pacajes Province

Municipalities of La Paz Department (Bolivia)